Direct Action: Day 21 is an album by punk band Sham 69, released in 2001.

Track listing
All songs by Jimmy Pursey and Dave Parsons unless noted
 "99% 2000" - 4:04
 "Direct Action" - 2:57
 "Mad as a Cow" - 3:03
 "Little Bit of This (Little Bit of That)" - 3:37
 "Security Guard" - 2:30
 "Dig It" - 3:03 (Parsons, Pursey, Ian Whitewood)
 "Tattoo" - 2:58
 "Monica" - 3:28
 "15 Minutes" - 4:24 (Parsons, Pursey, Mat Sargent)
 "S.H.A.G." - 3:13
 "Tolstoy's Ape" - 3:40
 "Do You Believe" - 5:08
 "This Time" - 3:19
 "Here We Are" - 3:03

Personnel
Jimmy Pursey - vocals, producer
Dave Parsons - guitar
Mat Sargent - bass
Ian Whitewood - drums

Brian Adams - executive producer

References

2001 albums
Sham 69 albums